Grzegorz Fonfara (born 8 June 1983 in Katowice) is a Polish footballer who plays as a defender.

National team
He is a former member of U-21 Poland national football team.

References

External links

Polish footballers
1983 births
Living people
Sportspeople from Katowice
GKS Katowice players
GKS Bełchatów players
Zagłębie Sosnowiec players
Stal Mielec players
Rozwój Katowice players
Szczakowianka Jaworzno players
Poland under-21 international footballers
Ekstraklasa players
I liga players
II liga players
III liga players
Association football defenders